Shut Up and Shoot Me is a 2005 Czech black comedy film.  It was written and directed by Steen Agro and stars Karel Roden, Andy Nyman, and Anna Geislerová.

See also
 Tribulations of a Chinaman in China (novel by Jules Verne, 1879)
 Flirting with Fate (1916)
 The Man in Search of His Murderer (1931)
 The Whistler (1944)
 Five Days (1954)
 Up to His Ears (1965)
 Tulips (1981)
 I Hired a Contract Killer (1990)
 Bulworth (1998)

External links

2005 films
Films shot in the Czech Republic
2005 black comedy films
2005 comedy films
Czech black comedy films
2000s Czech films